is a train station located in the city of Yawata, Kyoto Prefecture, Japan.

Lines
 Keihan Electric Railway
 Keihan Main Line

Adjacent stations

Railway stations in Kyoto Prefecture